George Elliott may refer to:

Politicians
George Elliott (Canadian politician) (before 1800—1844), Irish-born member of Legislative Assembly of Upper Canada
George Elliott (British politician) (1847–1925), MP for Islington West, 1918–1922
George Adam Elliott (1875–1944), Canadian member of House of Commons and Legislative Assembly of Ontario

Sportsmen
George Elliott (cricketer) (1850–1913), English right-handed batsman
George Elliott (Australian rules footballer) (1885–1917), with Melbourne University Football Club
George Elliott (footballer, born 1889) (1889–1948), Middlesbrough FC centre forward / inside right
George Elliott (American football) (born 1932), quarterback, halfback and coach

Writers
George P. Elliott (1918–1980), American poet, novelist and essayist
George Elliott (Canadian writer) (1923–1996), reporter, editor and short story author
George A. Elliott (born 1945), Canadian mathematician specializing in operator algebras

Others
George Elliott (spy) (before 1555—after 1581), English confidence man, a/k/a George Eliot, who arrested Edmund Campion
George Elliott (surgeon) (c. 1636–1668), English military doctor
George F. Elliott (1846–1931), American major general, Marine Corps Commandant
George Elliott (bishop) (born 1949), Canadian suffragan bishop

See also
George Augustus Eliott, 1st Baron Heathfield (1717–1790), British Army officer
George Eliot (disambiguation)
George Elliot (disambiguation)